Steve Macdonald is an American filk singer/songwriter, who also appears at Renaissance Faires as "Gallamor the Bard". He served for several years as the Pegasus Award Evangelista, and was responsible for many changes in the award process that led to much greater participation among the voting base. He was inducted into the Filk Hall of Fame in 2006.

In September 2006 he emigrated to Germany.

WorlDream
WorlDream was a project that organized hundreds of filkers in North America and Europe to sing one song together, in celebration of the new millennium. Steve Macdonald, the project's instigator, attended ten conventions during 2001, and recorded filkers singing "Many Hearts, One Voice", a song he composed for the project. The tracks were then merged electronically. A number of one-off CDs of raw mixes were sold as Interfilk auction items, but due to lost tapes and technical difficulties, public release only happened in January 2021, celebrating the 20th anniversary of the project.  

Singers were taped at all nine filk conventions held in 2001, in the United States, in Canada, the United Kingdom, and Germany, as well as the 2001 World Science Fiction Convention in Philadelphia. Altogether 436 singers were recorded, many at more than one convention.

Discography
 Songspinner, 1994, Dodeka Records
 Journey's Done, 1995, Dodeka Records
 Reap The Wind, 1999, Dodeka Records
 Crossroads, 2002, Dodeka Records
 Gather Day, 2004, Thin Ice Studios
 Drive By Barding, 2006, Thin Ice Studios
 Rowan & Storm (as part of the duo "Twotonic"), 2014, Mystic Fig Studio

Pegasus Awards 
 Best Filk Song 1995, Journey's Done
 Best Writer/Composer 1995
 Best Myth Song 1998, Cold Butcher
 Best Performer 1998
 Best Dorsai Song 2007, Shai! (with Steve Simmons)
 Best Adapted Song 2015, Grabthar's Silver Hammer
 Best Song About Community 2018, Many Hearts, One Voice
 Best Performer 2018 – as part of the duo Twotonic

External links
Official Web Page
WorlDream home page
Filk Hall of Fame Citation

References

Filkers
Renaissance fair performers
Living people
American expatriates in Germany
Year of birth missing (living people)